James Michael "Jim" Parker (born 16 December 1934) is a BAFTA-winning British composer.

Career 
After graduating as a silver medallist at the Guildhall School of Music, Parker played with leading London orchestras and chamber groups as well as being a key part of The Barrow Poets for whom he provided both original instrumental music and music to accompany the performance of a wide range of poetry spoken or sung by the rest of the band. This music was played on a variety of instruments including the bass cacacofiddle, a home made sort of double bass with knobs on, played by William Bealby-Wright, while Parker mostly played oboe and cor anglais..

Parker subsequently concentrated on composing and conducting. He had early success with a series of recordings in which he set the poems of the British Poet Laureate Sir John Betjeman to music; Banana Blush, Late Flowering Love (both 1974), Sir John Betjeman's Britain (1977) and Varsity Rag (1981). The albums, in which the poet recited his own words and the composer conducted a small group of musicians, have continued to be held in high regard by listeners and critics.

These and subsequent records, including Captain Beaky, with words by Jeremy Lloyd, which topped the charts as both a single and album, led to work in television as well as in London West End theatres, where Parker has had three musicals produced. The most successful of these was "Follow the Star", with book and lyrics by Wally K Daly. It was originally produced at Chichester and was directed by Wendy Toye.

Film and television 
Film scores include music for numerous feature-length television films and for new prints of the classic silent films Girl Shy, by Harold Lloyd, and The Blot, a 1921 film directed by Lois Weber.

He has won the British Academy Award for Best Original Television Music four times, and has written scores for over two hundred programmes. His work in film and television ranges from music for Moll Flanders, Tom Jones, Midsomer Murders, Foyle's War, The House of Eliott, and Mapp & Lucia to the score for the contemporary political thrillers House of Cards (UK version), To Play the King and The Final Cut as well as the British children's series Fourways Farm. The opening and closing theme music for those TV series is entitled "Francis Urquhart's March." With Tom Stanier he wrote the music for schools programmes such as Watch, Zig Zag and Fourways Farm plus musicals such as Blast Off: Mr Jones Goes To Jupiter.

Concert works 
Concert works have been written for the Nash Ensemble, Philip Jones Brass, The Hilliard Ensemble, The Albion Ensemble, The Wallace Collection and Poems on the Underground. His published compositions include "A Londoner in New York" for brass, "Mississippi Five" for wind quintet, "The Golden Section" for brass quintet, and a clarinet concerto. He is also the recipient of an honorary degree from the Guildhall School of Music and Drama.

References

External links

1934 births
Living people
Alumni of the Guildhall School of Music and Drama
BAFTA winners (people)
British composers
Musicians from County Durham
People from Hartlepool